Jana Ranjani is a raga in Carnatic music, the classical music of South India. It is a janya raga of Shankarabharanam, the 29th of the 72 melakarta ragas. The raga is named thus because it induces a feeling of enjoyment (Jana – People and Ranjani – can be enjoyed by people) among the rasikas (audience).

Structure and Lakshana 
It is a Vakra sampoorna – Audava ragam i.e. the ascending scale has all the notes in a zig-zag manner and the descending scale has five notes. Its Arohana–Avarohana structure is as follows:

Arohana: 

Avarohana:

Popular compositions 
 "Vidajaladhura" by Tyagaraja
 "Nadadina" by Tyagaraja
 "Pahimam Sri Rajarajeswari" by Maha Vaidyanatha Iyer
 Third Charanam of "Ranjani Mridupankaja Lochani" of Tanjavur Sankara Iyer.
 "Smarane Sukhamu Rama Nama" by Tyagaraja
 "nannu brOva rAdA" of Syaama Sasthri
Pranapathe nee salaho by Vyasatirtha

Related ragas 
This section covers the theoretical and scientific aspect of this rāga.

Janaranjani is very similar to Poornachandrika and these Ragas are known as twin Ragas. Unless sung with perfect sangathis and pidis, it is highly difficult to differentiate between the two.

Notes

References 

 Ragas in Carnatic music by Dr. S. Bhagyalekshmy, Pub. 1990, CBH Publications

External links 
 

Janya ragas